The 1977 Princeton Tigers football team was an American football team that represented Princeton University during the 1977 NCAA Division I football season. Princeton finished sixth in the Ivy League.

In their fifth and final year under head coach Robert Casciola, the Tigers compiled a 3–6 record and were outscored 144 to 137. Bobby L. Isom and Lawrence P. Lutz were the team captains.

Princeton's 3–4 conference record placed sixth in the Ivy League standings. The Tigers outscored Ivy opponents 118 to 103. 

Princeton played its home games at Palmer Stadium on the university campus in Princeton, New Jersey.

Schedule

References

Princeton
Princeton Tigers football seasons
Princeton Tigers football